The Brass Monkey Half Marathon is an annual road running event held outside York, United Kingdom. The event is organised by the York Knavesmire Harriers club and has been run since the early 1980s. In the early years the event was a contest for club runners but has expanded over its three decades attracting some of the country’s elite runners, these include Olympians Angela Tooby-Smith and Tracey Morris, and international ultra-runner Carolyn Hunter-Rowe. Despite the winter location of the race, it attracted a 1500 strong field in 2014 and 2016.

Course

The race starts and finishes at York Racecourse, the course is on roads passing through Bishopthorpe, Acaster Selby, Appleton Roebuck and returning through Bishopthorpe.

Past winners 

1985-1998 Results from "SQUARE WASPS"

References

External links
 Official Site
 ARRS Race series

Half marathons in the United Kingdom
Athletics competitions in the United Kingdom
Recurring sporting events established in 1982
1982 establishments in the United Kingdom
Annual sporting events in the United Kingdom